Kimbro may refer to:

 Kimbro (surname)
 Kimbro, Texas, small unincorporated community in northeast Travis County, Texas, United States
 Hayle Kimbro Pool, wetland on The Lizard, Cornwall
 USNS Sgt. Truman Kimbro (T-AK-254), Boulder Victory-class cargo ship built for the U.S. Maritime Commission in World War II

See also
 Kimbra (born 1990), New Zealand singer and actress
 Kimbrough